This is a list of waterfalls in Zambia.
 Chavuma Falls
 Kabwelume Falls
 Kalambo Falls
 Lumangwe Falls
 Ngonye Falls
 Ntumbachushi Falls
 Victoria Falls
 Kudabwika Falls
 Mumbuluma Falls
 Mutumuna Falls
 Kabweluma Falls
 Chilambwe Falls
 Fwaka Falls
 Chimpepe Falls
 Chisimba Falls
 Chimpolo Falls
 Kundalila Falls
 Nyambwezi Falls
 Mpwasha Falls

See also 

 Tourism in Zambia

Zambia
Waterfalls